Old and New is an album of American guitarist Norman Blake, released in 1975. It was reissued in 1992 by Flying Fish along with The Fields of November as a double CD.

Reception

In his Allmusic review, critic Jim Smith wrote "All of the musicians from Fields of November are present, but overall the energy is higher, especially on the instrumentals "Miller's Reel" and "Aljimina.""

Track listing 
All songs by Norman Blake unless otherwise noted.

Side one
 "Widow's Creek"
 "Bristol in the Bottle"
 "Billy Gray"
 "Forked Deer" (Traditional)
 "Rubagfre"
 "Cuckoo's Nest" (Traditional)
 "Witch of the Wake" (Traditional)
 "My Old Home in the Green Mountain Side"

Side two
 "Miller's Reel" (Traditional)
 "Dry Grass in the High Fields"
 "Harvey's Reel"
 "The Railroad Days"
 "Valley Head"
 "Sweet Heaven" (Traditional)
 "Sally in the Garden" (Traditional)
 "Aljamina"
 "Flat Rock"

Personnel
Norman Blake – guitar, fiddle, dobro, mandolin, vocals
Charlie Collins – guitar, fiddle
Nancy Short – cello, bass, viola
Tut Taylor – dobro
Ben Pedigo – banjo

References

1975 debut albums
Norman Blake (American musician) albums
Rounder Records albums